Uładzimir Arłou, known as U. A. Arlou (born 25 August 1953 in Polotsk, Byelorussian SSR, Soviet Union) is a Belarusian historian, writer, politician, and poet. He is chairman of the Belarusian PEN International.

Biography 
Uladzimier Arloŭ was born into a family of intelligentsia. His mother was a teacher of history and his father held the position of a public prosecutor. In 1975 he graduated from the School of History of the Belarusian State University (BSU) and went on to work in Novopolotsk as a teacher of history (1975—1976), and then as a reporter, head of a department, and deputy editor-in-chief for the Chimik (Chemist) municipal paper (1976—1986). After he moved to Miensk he held the position of an editor at Mastackaja Litaratura Publishers (1988—1997). Uladzimier Arloŭ is a member of the Belarusian Writers’ Union and the Belarusian Centre of the International P.E.N. In 1988 he joined the Adradžeńnie (Revival) Belarusian People’s Front and was elected twice to its Sojm (Assembly). At present he does not belong to any political party. Uladzimier Arloŭ is a Uniate (Greek Catholic). He lives in Miensk.

Creative work 
Uladzimier Arloŭ published his debut poems in Blakitny Lichtar (Blue Lantern) student underground self-publish magazine in Navapolack in 1973. At the BSU he was one of the students who launched Milavica underground self-publish miscellany in Miensk (1974—1976). This was the reason why he was summoned to the KGB ‘for preventive conversations’. In the 1970s and the 1980s Uladzimier Arloŭ and Vinceś Mudroŭ took part in copying and distributing a number of Belarusian publications that were forbidden at the time, including the Russian-Belarusian (Kryvičian) Dictionary by Vaclaŭ Lastoŭski.

Uladzimier Arloŭ first won renown for his prose, including historical writings, and later on was also acclaimed as a remarkable essayist and poet.

He has written a great many books of prose, poetry, historical publications, and essays.

Uladzimier Arloŭ’s writings have been translated into a number of languages, including English, German, Polish, Swedish, Czech, Ukrainian, Hungarian, French, Romanian, Russian, Estonian, Lithuanian, Latvian, Slovak, and Georgian. His essay Independence, written in 1990, has been rendered into 25 languages.
He also wrote scripts to popular science documentaries Eŭfrasińnia of Polacak, Polacak Mazes, Simiaon of Polacak and others.

Uladzimier Arloŭ translated There Was Such a Village by Mikalaj Ulaščyk from Russian into Belarusian in 1989, The Murder of Peter the Unknown by Valery Shevchuk in 1993 and Rovno/Rivne by Oleksandr Irvanets’ in 2007 from Ukrainian into Belarusian.

‘Uladzimier Arloŭ masterfully writes historical prose and ironic essays. His filigree style and Rabelaisian humour have made him one Belarus’ most popular writers.’ (ARCHE journal)

Bibliography 
(In Belarusian)

 Добры дзень, мая Шыпшына. Апавяданні, аповесць. — Мн., 1986
 День, калі ўпала страла. Аповесці і апавяданні. — Мн., 1988
 Асветніца з роду Усяслава. Ефрасіння Полацкая. — Мн., 1989
 Пока не погасла свеча. Повести и рассказы. — М., 1990
 Там, за дзвярыма. Вершы ў прозе. — Мн., 1991
 Рандэву на манеўрах. Аповесць. Апавяданні. — Мн., 1992
 Еўфрасіння Полацкая. Евфросиния Полоцкая. — Мн., 1992
 Прысуд выканаў невядомы. Ігнат Грынявіцкі. — Мн., 1992
 «Совершенно секретно», альбо Адзін у трох іпастасях. Літаратурна-публіцыстычныя артыкулы. Эсэ. — Мн., 1992
 Міласць князя Гераніма. Аповесці. Апавяданні. — Мн., 1992
 Мой радавод да пятага калена. Эсэ. — Мн., 1993
 Пяць мужчын у леснічоўцы. Аповесці. Апавяданні. — Мн., 1994
 Таямніцы полацкай гісторыі. Гістарычныя эсэ. — Мн., 1994, 2000, 2002, 2008
 Фаўна сноў. Вершы. — Мн., 1995
 Тайны полоцкой истории. Исторические эссе. — Мн., 1995, 2012
 Адкуль наш род. Апавяданні. — Мн., 1996; Вільня, 2000, 2003
 Рэквіем для бензапілы. Аповесці. Апавяданні. — Мн., 1998
 Божая кароўка зь Пятай авэню. Эсэ. — Мн., 1998
 Жыватворны сімвал Бацькаўшчыны. Гісторыя Крыжа святой Еўфрасінні Полацкай. Животворный символ Отчизны. История креста святой Евфросинии Полоцкой. — Мн., 1998
 Дзесяць вякоў беларускай гісторыі. (У суаўтарстве з Генадзем Сагановічам). 862—1918. Падзеі. Даты. Ілюстрацыі. — Вільня, 1999, 2000, 2002
 Еўфрасіння Полацкая. Жыццяпіс і даследаванне спадчыны асветніцы. — Мн., 2000
 Requiem dla piły motorowej. Proza. — Białystok, 2000
 Десять веков белорусской истории. 862—1918. События. Даты. Иллюстрации. (В соавторстве с Генадзем Сагановичем). — Вильня, 2001
 Сны імператара. Апавяданні. Аповесці. Эсэ. — Мн., 2001
 Краіна Беларусь. Ілюстраваная гісторыя. Мастак Зміцер Герасімовіч — Марцін (Славакія), 2003, Браціслава, 2012, 2013
 Ордэн Белай Мышы. Аповесці. Апавяданні. — Мн., 2003, 2013
 Адкусі галаву вароне. Эсэ. — Мн., 2003
 Каханак яе вялікасці. Гістарычныя апавяданні. Эсэ. — Мн., 2004
 Час чумы. Гістарычныя аповесці. Апавяданні. — Мн., 2005
 Реквієм для бензопилки. Оповідання та повість. — Київ, 2005
 Сланы Ганібала. Выбраныя эсэ. — Мн., 2005
 Ад Полацка пачаўся свет. Гістарычныя эсэ. — Мн., 2005
 Kochanek jej wysokości. Proza. — Wrocław. 2006
 Паром празь Ля-Манш. Вершы. — Мн., 2006
 Час чумы. Аўдыёкніга. — Мн., 2006
 Імёны Свабоды. — Радыё Свабодная Эўропа/Радыё Свабода, 2007, 2009, 2015, 2020
 Адкуль наш род. Аўдыёкніга. — Мн.,, 2007
 Таямніцы полацкай гісторыі. Аўдыёкніга. — Мн,, 2008
 Сны імператара. Аўдыёкніга. — Мн., 2008
 Паўстанцы. Аўдыёкніга. — Мн., 2008
 Паром празь Ля-Манш. Аўдыёкніга. — Мн., 2008
 Ордэн Белай Мышы. Аўдыёкніга. — Мн., 2008
 Prom przez kanał La Manche. Wiersze. — Gdańsk., 2009
 Усё па-ранейшаму толькі імёны зьмяніліся. Вершы. — Мн., 2009
 Ля Дзікага Поля. Гістарычныя апавяданні. Аповесць. Эсэ. — Мн., 2010
 Імёны Свабоды. Аўдыёкніга — Радыё Свабодная Эўропа/Радыё Свабода, 2011
 Пакуль ляціць страла. 100 пытаньняў пісьменьніку. — Радыё Свабодная Эўропа/Радыё Свабода, 2012
 Сьвецяцца вокны ды нікога за імі. Вершы. — Мн., 2012
 Краіна Беларусь: Вялікае Княства Літоўскае. Ілюстраваная гісторыя. Мастак Зміцер Герасімовіч. —  Браціслава, 2012, 2013
 Страна Беларусь. Иллюстрированная история. Художник Змицер Герасимович. —  Братислава, 2013
 This country called Belarus. An Illustrated History — Bratislava, 2013
 Ад Полацка пачаўся свет. My Polacak, the Cradle of the World —  Мн., 2014
 Patria aeterna: apaviadańni — Miensk, 2015
 Айчына: маляўнічая гісторыя. Ад Рагнеды да Касцюшкі. Мастак Павел Татарнікаў.  —Мн., 2016, 2017, 2019
 Танцы над горадам. Тры аповесці — Мн., 2017
 Краіна Ур. Вершы. — Мн., 2018
 Я марыў стаць шпіёнам. Выбраная проза. Мн., 2018
 Вустрыцы а пятай раніцы. Выбраныя эсэ. Мн., 2018
 Архіварыус Война. Гістарычная проза. Мн., 2018
 Танцы на горадам. Проза апошніх гадоў. Мн, 2018
 Belarus. The epoch of the Grand Duchy of Lithuania. An illustrated history. —  Vilnius, 2018
 Faszination Belarus. Illustrierte Geschichte. Eines unbekannten landes. — Vilnius, 2018
 Паручнік Пятровіч і прапаршчык Здань. Балады — Мн., 2018
 Porucznik Piatrowicz i chorąży Duch. Ballady — Lublin, 2021
 Все як раніше лише імена змінилися. Вірші — Київ, 2021
 Краєвид з ментоловим ароматом. Коротка проза — Львів, 2021

Awards 
 1986 — The Prize of the Belarusian Komsomol (Young Communists’ League) for Dobry Dzień, maja Šypšyna (My dear Šypšyna).
 1990 — The Francišak Skaryna medal ‘for contribution to the subject of Belarusian history in literature’.
 1993 — The Uladzimier Karatkievič Prize for the books Eŭfrasińnia Polackaja (Eŭfrasińnia of Polacak) and Randevu na manieŭrach (A Rendez-vous during the Manoeuvres).
 1996 — The Francišak Bahuševič Literary Prize awarded by the Belarusian Centre of the International P.E.N. for Tajamnicy polackaj history (The Mysteries of Polacak History).
 1998 — The Hliniany Vialies (Clay Vialies) Prize awarded by the Society of Free Writers for Božaja karoŭka ź Piataj Aveniu (A Ladybird from Fifth Avanue).
 2004 — The Boris Kit Prize (Germany).
 2006 — „Zalataya litera” prize for the collection of poems Parom praź La Manche (A Cross-Channel Ferry).
 2010 — The European Poet of Freedom international prize (Poland) for Parom praź La Manche (A Cross-Channel Ferry).
 2015 — The Golden Apostrophe Prize awarded by Dziejasloŭ literary journal for Tancy nad horadam (Dances above the City) novella.
 2015 — Silver medal „Zasłużony Kulturze Gloria Artis” (Honoured Art Worker) (Poland).
 2016 — The Aleko International Literary Prize (Bulgaria).
 2016 — The Alieś Adamovič Literary Prize awarded by the Belarusian Centre of the International P.E.N. for Imiony Svabody (The Names of Freedom).
 2017 — The Ciotka Prize for Ajčyna: maliaŭničaja historyja. Ad Rahniedy da Kaściuški (Belarus: an Illustrated History. From Rahnieda to Kaściuška).
 2018 — The Jerzy Giedroyć Literary Prize for Tancy nad horadam (Dances above the City).
 2019 — The 100 Years of the Belarusian Democratic Republic medal awarded by the Council of the Belarusian Democratic Republic.

External links 
 Biography info (Belarusian)
 Literature Radio Belarus (Belarusian)

References 

1953 births
Living people
20th-century Belarusian writers
21st-century Belarusian writers
BPF Party politicians
20th-century Belarusian historians
Belarusian male writers
Belarusian male poets
Belarusian-language writers
Film people from Minsk
People from Polotsk
Writers from Minsk
20th-century male writers
20th-century Belarusian poets
21st-century Belarusian poets
Male non-fiction writers
21st-century Belarusian historians